Nothing is the concept of the absence of anything.

Nothing or The Nothing may also refer to:

Zero, the mathematical concept of the quantity of things in "nothing"
The empty set, the mathematical concept of the collection of things represented by "nothing"
nothing, an English indefinite pronoun
Null, a value that a variable of nullable type in a computer program can take
 Vacuum
 Quantum Vacuum Fluctuations

Books 
 Nothing (novel), a 2000 novel by Janne Teller
 Nothing: Something to Believe In, a 2007 book by Nica Lalli
 Nothing, a 1950 novel by Henry Green
 Nothing: A Portrait of Insomnia, a 2011 memoir by Blake Butler
 Nothing, a fictional substance in the Keys to the Kingdom series by Garth Nix
 The Nothing, a destructive force in the novel The Neverending Story and some adaptations

Music 
 Nothing (opera), a 2016 opera by David Bruce

Bands, musicians, and labels
 Jeffrey "Nothing" Hatrix, an American singer, formerly of Mushroomhead
 Nothing (band), an American shoegaze band
 Crossfade (band), an American rock band once known as The Nothing
 Nothing Records, a defunct American record label

Albums 
 Nothing (Meshuggah album)
 Nothing (N.E.R.D album)
 Nothing (EP), by Diatribe, or the title song
 Nothing, by Æon Spoke
 Nothing, by Dwight Yoakam
 Nothing, by Higher Intelligence Agency
 Nothing, by Velocity Girl
 The Nothing, by Johnny Polygon
 The Nothing (Korn album)

Songs 
 "Nothing" (A song), a song by A
 "Nothing" (Dwight Yoakam song)
 "Nothing" (Janet Jackson song)
 "Nothing" (The Script song)
 "Nothing" (A Chorus Line song), from the musical A Chorus Line
 "Nothin (song), by N.O.R.E.
 "Nothin' (That Compares 2 U)", by The Jacksons
 "Nothing", by Aimee Mann from Whatever
 "Nothing", by Anthrax from Stomp 442
 "Nothing", by Depeche Mode from Music for the Masses
 "Nothing", by Edie Brickell from Shooting Rubberbands at the Stars
 "Nothing", by Flipper from Album – Generic Flipper
 "Nothing", by The Fugs from The Fugs First Album
 "Nothing", by God Forbid from Determination
 "Nothing", by Hi-Standard from Making the Road
 "Nothing", by Holden & Thompson; see James Holden (producer)
 "Nothing", by Jeremy Camp from Stay
 "Nothing", by Misery Signals from Controller
 “Nothing”, by Modestep and Virtual Riot from the Echoes EP
 "Nothing", by Negative Approach from Tied Down
 "Nothing", by Pedro the Lion from Whole
 "Nothing", by Phish from Undermind
 "Nothin'", by Robert Plant and Alison Krauss from Raising Sand 
 "Nothing", by Saliva from Under Your Skin
 "Nothing", by Stabbing Westward from Ungod
 "Nothing (The Rat)", by Code Orange from Love Is Love/Return to Dust
 "Nothing (Why)", by Dope from Life
 "Nothing, Parts 1-24", an early title for the Pink Floyd song "Echoes"
 "Nothin' Song", by Alice in Chains from Alice in Chains
 "The Nothing", from the soundtrack of the video game Deus Ex
 "The Nothing", by Eighteen Visions from Until the Ink Runs Out
 "The Nothing", by Kid Cudi from Speedin' Bullet 2 Heaven
 "The Nothing", by Skycamefalling from 10.21

Other
Nothing (film), a 2003 Canadian film directed by Vincenzo Natali
Nothing, Arizona, an unincorporated (now abandoned) settlement in Mohave County, Arizona, U.S.
 n0thing, a professional American Counter-Strike player
 Nothing (technology company), a technology company founded by Carl Pei

See also 
 /dev/zero a special file in Unix-like operating systems that outputs zeros
 IEFBR14, an IBM mainframe utility program that acts as a placeholder whose purpose is to do nothing
 Nihilism, a philosophical concept
 Null device, a special computer file, named /dev/null on Unix systems, that discards all data written to it
 None (disambiguation)
 Null (disambiguation)
 Void (disambiguation)
 Zero (disambiguation)